Massimo Colaci  (born 21 February 1985) is an Italian volleyball player, a member of the Italy men's national volleyball team and Sir Safety Perugia, silver medalist of the 2015 World Cup, bronze medalist of the 2015 European Championship and the 2014 World League. He also won the silver medal at the 2016 Summer Olympics.

Sporting achievements

Clubs

FIVB Club World Championship
  2016 - with Trentino Diatec
  2022 – with Sir Safety Susa Perugia

CEV Champions League
  2015/2016 - with Trentino Diatec

National championships
 2016/2017  Italian Championship, with Diatec Trentino
 2022/2023  Italian Super Cup, with Sir Safety Susa Perugia

National team
 2015  FIVB World Cup
 2016  Olympic Games

External links
LegaVolley player profile

1985 births
Living people
Sportspeople from the Province of Lecce
Italian men's volleyball players
Trentino Volley players
Olympic volleyball players of Italy
Volleyball players at the 2016 Summer Olympics
Medalists at the 2016 Summer Olympics
Olympic silver medalists for Italy
Olympic medalists in volleyball
Volleyball players at the 2020 Summer Olympics
Liberos
21st-century Italian people